{{DISPLAYTITLE:C7H11N3O2}}
The molecular formula C7H11N3O2 (molar mass: 169.18 g/mol, exact mass: 169.0851 u) may refer to:

 Histidine methyl ester (HME)
 Ipronidazole
 3-Methylhistidine (3-MH)

Molecular formulas